Norrö may refer to:

 Norrö, Österåkers Municipality - a locality situated in Österåker Municipality, Stockholm County, Sweden
 Norrö, Värmdö Municipality - an island in the Stockholm archipelago and in Värmdö Municipality, Stockholm County, Sweden